John Law may refer to:

Arts and entertainment
John Law (artist) (born 1958), American artist
John Law (comics), comic-book character created by Will Eisner
John Law (film director), Hong Kong film director
John Law (musician) (born 1961), British jazz pianist and composer
John Law (writer) (1929–1970), British TV comedy writer
John Law, pseudonym of Margaret Harkness (1854–1923), English journalist and writer
John Phillip Law (1937–2008), American film actor
"John Law", a song by Dropkick Murphys first released on The Singles Collection, Volume 1

Politics
John Law (New Zealand politician), mayor of Rodney District in New Zealand
John Law (representative) (1796–1873), U.S. Representative from Indiana
John Martin Law Jr. (1903–1981), mayor of Eau Gallie, Florida, from 1943 to 1950

Religion
John Law (bishop) (1745–1810), English mathematician and Church of Ireland bishop
John Law (priest) (1739–1827), Anglican priest
John Law (minister) (died 1712), Scottish minister

Science and academia
John Law (economist) (1671–1729), Scottish economist
John Law (sociologist) (born 1946), sociologist at the Open University

Sports
John B. Law, head college football coach for the Manhattan College Jaspers, New York, 1930–1931
John Law (Australian footballer) (born 1959), Australian rules footballer
John Law (American football) (1905–1962), American football player
John Law (footballer, born 1887) (fl. 1887–1914), Scottish footballer
John Law (cricketer), English cricketer

See also 
John Laws (born 1935), Australian radio broadcaster
John Laws (judge) (1945–2020), English judge
John Lowe (disambiguation)